Heliswiss AG is a Swiss helicopter company with headquarters on the property of Bern Airport in Belp, Switzerland, near Bern.

History

Heliswiss - the oldest helicopter company in Switzerland - was founded as „Heliswiss Schweizerische Helikopter AG“ with headquarters in Berne-Belp on April 17, 1953. This was the beginning of helicopter flying in Switzerland. During the following years Heliswiss expanded in Switzerland and formed a network with bases in Belp BE, Samedan GR, Domat Ems GR, Locarno TI, Erstfeld UR, Gampel VS, Gstaad BE and Gruyères FR.

During the build-up of the rescue-company Schweizerische Rettungsflugwacht (REGA) as an independent network, Heliswiss carried out rescue missions on their behalf.

Heliswiss carried out operations all over the world: in Greenland, Suriname, North Africa and South America.

The first helicopter owned by Heliswiss was a Bell 47 G-1. It was registered as HB-XAG on September 23, 1953. From 1963 Heliswiss started to expand and began to operate with medium helicopters like the Agusta Bell 204B with a turbine power of 1050 HP and an external load of up to 1500 kg. From 1979 Heliswiss operated a Bell 214 (external load up to 2.8 t). Since 1991 Heliswiss operates a Russian Kamov 32A12 which was joined by a
second one in 2015.

Current fleet

Swiss Helicopter's fleet comprises some 36 helicopters (as at December 2013):

Bases
Flughafen Bern-Belp, Samedan GR, Domat/Ems GR, Locarno Airport, Erstfeld UR, Gampel VS and Gruyères FR.
Gstaad BE(winter base)

Products
Flight-training (basic training, commercial pilot, mountain training, night-flight)
Charter flights
VIP-flights
Heli-skiing
Film- and foto-flights
External load flights (up to 5000 kg), logging
Firefighting

Partners/Subsidiaries
Air Grischa
BOHAG
Heli Gotthard
Heliswiss International AG
Eliticino
Air Zermatt AG
Rhein-Helikopter AG   (Liechtenstein only)

References

External links

Homepage Heliswiss
Heliswiss Fleetlist

Airlines of Switzerland
Helicopter airlines
Airlines established in 1958
1958 establishments in Switzerland